Zakharovsky District is an administrative and municipal district (raion), one of the twenty-five in Ryazan Oblast, Russia. It is located in the west of the oblast. Its administrative center is the rural locality (a selo) of Zakharovo. Population: 9,136 (2010 Census);  The population of Zakharovo accounts for 30.0% of the district's total population.

Notable residents 

 Alexander Vasilyevich Alexandrov (1883–1946), composer of the national anthem, born in the village of Plakhino
 Boris Donskoy (1894–1918), revolutionary, born in the village of Gladkie Vyselki

References

Notes

Sources

Districts of Ryazan Oblast